The Socket FT1 or BGA413 is a CPU socket released in January 2011 from AMD for its APUs codenamed Desna, Ontario, Zacate and Hondo. The uber name is "Brazos".

 "Desna"-, "Ontario"-, "Zacate"- and "Hondo"-branded products combine Bobcat with Cedar (VLIW5 TeraScale), UVD 3 video acceleration and AMD Eyefinity-based multi-monitor support of maximum two monitors.

For available chipsets consult Fusion controller hubs (FCH).

Feature overview for AMD APUs

See also
 List of AMD processors with 3D graphics
 List of AMD mobile microprocessors

External links

 Socket FS1 Design Specification

AMD mobile sockets
AMD sockets